The United States Air Force's  6th Intelligence Squadron is an intelligence unit located at Osan Air Base, Korea.  During World War II, as the 6th Radio Squadron, Mobile, it gathered intelligence for 10th Air Force from listening posts in India.

Mission
The mission of the 6th Intelligence Squadron is to execute 24/7 imagery and analytical operations, as part of the Distributed Ground System-Three (DGS-3), to support Seventh Air Force during armistice and war.

History

World War II
The squadron was first established in the Signal Corps at Hamilton Field shortly after the attack on Pearl Harbor as the 140th Signal Radio Intelligence Company.  The unit trained in California and was converted to an Air Corps unit in the summer of 1944 as the 6th Radio Squadron, Mobile, specializing in intercepting radio transmissions in Japanese.

In September 1944, the squadron shipped to India, arriving the following month.  Until V-J Day, it conducted operations from Barrackpore, India, remaining in theater through November 1945, when it returned to the United States and was inactivated.  It remained inactive until it was disbanded in 1983.

Korea
The squadron was reconstituted as the 6th Intelligence Squadron and reactivated in 2009 at Osan Air Base, Korea.

Lineage
 Constituted as the 140th Signal Radio Intelligence Company, Aviation on 7 February 1942
 Activated on 14 February 1942
 Redesignated 6th Radio Squadron, Mobile (J) on 31 Mar 1944
 inactivated on 7 December 1945
 Redesignated 6th Radio Squadron, Mobile on 14 November 1946 (not active)
 Disbanded on 15 June 1983
 Reconstituted and redesignated 6th Intelligence Squadron on 9 December 2008
 Activated on 1 January 2009

Assignments
 Fourth Air Force, 14 February 1942 – 26 September 1944
 Tenth Air Force, 28 October 1944 – 7 December 1945
 694th Intelligence, Surveillance and Reconnaissance Group, 1 January 2009 – present

Stations
 Hamilton Field, California, 14 February 1942
 Army Air Base, Bakersfield, California, 28 April 1942
 Hammer Field, California, 13 August 1942
 Dale City, California, 10 February 1943
 Camp Pinedale, California, 11 July 1944
 Camp Anza, California, 16–26 September 1944
 Bombay, India, 28 October 1944 
 Kanchrapara, India, 1 November 1944
 Barrackpore, India, 26 November 1944
 Calcutta, India, 5–8 November 1945
 Camp Kilmer, New Jersey, 6–7 December 1945
 Osan Air Base, Korea, 1 January 2009 – present

References
 Notes

 Citations

External links
 Air Force Intelligence, Surveillance and Reconnaissance Agency

0006